Equivocal is the grammatical quality of ambiguity due to a term's having multiple meanings.  It is the latin translation of the greek adjective "homonymous". 

 Equivocation, in logic, a fallacy from using a phrase in multiple senses
 Equivocal generation, in biology, the disproven theory of spontaneous generation from a host organism

See also 
 Equivocation (disambiguation)